The redspot darter (Etheostoma artesiae) is a species of freshwater ray-finned fish, a darter from the subfamily Etheostomatinae, part of the family Percidae, which also contains the perches, ruffes and pikeperches. It is endemic to the United States in the Gulf Coast drainages from Texas to Alabama.

References

Etheostoma
Fish described in 1881
Taxa named by Oliver Perry Hay